Göcek Island is a Mediterranean island of Turkey.

The island faces Göcek a touristic town and a small port. The island is a natural breakwater and it protects Göcek from most of the winds.

The island is uninhabited. But there are beaches in both the east and the west shore and there is a quay in the east shore (so called İncirli) for boat services from Göcek.

References

External links
For images

Mediterranean islands
Islands of Turkey
Islands of Muğla Province
Fethiye District